Kalkanlı is a village in the Yayladere District, Bingöl Province, Turkey. The village is populated by Kurds of the Kubat tribe and had a population of 74 in 2021.

Tha hamlets of Çenberli, Kalecik, Kurt, Sarıkonak, Sarmaşık, Sarp and Soğanlı are attached to the village.

References 

Villages in Yayladere District
Kurdish settlements in Bingöl Province